Seishu may refer to:

 , another name for sake.
 , another name for Ise Province.
 , a Japanese surgeon of the Edo period with a knowledge of Chinese herbal medicine.
 , a well-known Japanese novelist.
 , Japanese baseball player
 , Japanese actor
 , politician and bureaucrat

Japanese masculine given names